José Higueras was the defending champion, but lost to Jimmy Brown in the second round.
Third seed Jimmy Arias defeated Andrés Gómez in the final to claim the title and first prize money of $51,000 .

Seeds
The top eight seeds received a bye into the second round. A champion seed is indicated in bold text while text in italics indicates the round in which that seed was eliminated.

  José Higueras (second round)
  José Luis Clerc (third round)
  Jimmy Arias (champion)
  Henrik Sundström (quarterfinals)
  Chris Lewis (quarterfinals)
  Andrés Gómez (final)
  Shlomo Glickstein (semifinals)
  Mel Purcell (semifinals)
  John Alexander (first round)
  Mario Martinez (third round)
  Pablo Arraya (third round)
  Corrado Barazzutti (third round)
  Diego Pérez (third round)
  Marcos Hocevar (first round)
  Libor Pimek (third round)
  Fernando Luna (third round)

Draw

Finals

Top half

Section 1

Section 2

Bottom half

Section 3

Section 4

References

External links

1983 Grand Prix (tennis)
Men's Singles